42 Days of Darkness is a six-part Chilean television series that premiered on Netflix on May 11, 2022. This Chilean crime thriller, directed by Gaspar Antillo and Claudia Huaiquimilla, is partially based on the true story of the disappearance in 2010 of Viviana Haeger depicted by Aline Küppenheim and on the search for answers undertaken by her sister, Cecilia, played by Claudia Di Girólamo.

Background
The series is based on the disappearance of Viviana Haeger on June 29, 2010, in Puerto Varas, Chile, but it takes some liberties with the actual events. Haeger, a mother of two daughters, was married at the time to Jaime Anguita. When her body was found in the attic of her Puerto Varas home on August 10, 2010, it was first thought to be suicide, and then murder. Her husband was charged, along with an accomplice, but the husband was ultimately acquitted due to a lack of evidence. The accomplice was sentenced to ten years in prison. Rodrigo Fluxá, who authored a book titled Usted sabe quién: notas sobre el homicidio de Viviana Haeger about the investigation and trial, also collaborated on the series.

Plot 
On the morning of June 29, 2010, Verónica Montes (Aline Küppenheim) disappears from her home in the Altos del Lago condominium, an exclusive area of Puerto Varas in southern Chile. The first clues are puzzling: the car keys were left in place, the most valuable objects in the house are untouched, and there are no signs of a possible robbery.

Mario Medina (Daniel Alcaíno), her husband and father of their two daughters, Karen (Julia Lübbert) and Emilia (Monserrat Lira), says that on that day, while he was out running an errand, he received a call asking for money in exchange for his wife's release.

The head of the search is Cecilia Montes (Claudia Di Girolamo), who tirelessly seeks her sister Verónica, who disappeared from her home without a trace. In this mission, she is accompanied by her lawyer Víctor Pizarro (Pablo Macaya), and together they will have to face the indifference of institutions, the many prejudices of society, and the harassment of the press.

Cast and characters

Main characters
 Claudia Di Girolamo as Cecilia Montes
 Pablo Macaya as Víctor Pizarro
 Daniel Alcaíno as Mario Medina
 Aline Küppenheim as Verónica Montes
 Gloria Münchmeyer as Berta Montes
 Julia Lübbert as Karen Medina
 Monserrat Lira as Emilia Medina
 Amparo Noguera as Nora Figueroa
 Néstor Cantillana as Braulio Sanchez
 Claudio Arredondo as Manuel Toledo
 Daniela Pino as Paula Asenjo
 Iván Cáceres as Joaquín Pizarro

Recurring cast
 Daniel Muñoz as Arturo Fernandez
 Tamara Acosta as Carmen Salazar
 Willy Semler as Cristian Lira
 Alejandro Goic as Regional Fiscal
 Eduardo Paxeco as Gustavo López 
 Paola Giannini as Monica Jimenez
 Claudia Cabezas as Manuela Roa
 Nelson Polanco as Ricardo Montes
 Andrés Suknic as Adolfo Varas
 Rodolfo Pulgar como Mayor of the Region of La Araucanía
 Jaime Azócar como Southern District Police Chief
 Hernán Lacalle como Inzunza
 Elvis Fuentes como Nelson
 Roque Artiagoitía as Karen Friend's
 Constanza Rojas as Karen Friend's
 Juan Carlos Maldonado as Silva

Episodes

Filming locations
This series was filmed in Santiago, Villarrica, Pucón, and Puerto Montt in Chile.

References

External links
 
 

2020s crime drama television series
2020s Spanish drama television series
Spanish-language Netflix original programming
Television shows filmed in Chile